Frederick John Barritt CBE (14 February 1916 – 13 May 2014) was a Bermudian politician and businessman. He served as the Speaker of the House of Assembly of Bermuda from 1979 to 1989. Besides this, he served more than three decades in Bermudian politics, serving as Deputy Speaker and Minister of Transportation during his time in politics.

He graduated from Saltus Grammar School, also serving a storied business career. From 1933 to 1970, he was with Powell and Company, serving as the managing director until the company was acquired by Purvis Limited.

He died on 13 May 2014. His son stated that he had suffered from Alzheimer's disease later in his life.

See also
 List of speakers of the House of Assembly of Bermuda

References

1916 births
2014 deaths
Speakers of the House of Assembly of Bermuda
Ministers of Transport of Bermuda
Members of the House of Assembly of Bermuda
United Bermuda Party politicians
Commanders of the Order of the British Empire
Bermudian politicians
People from Devonshire Parish
British diaspora
Leaders of the Opposition (Bermuda)